Keyhole Island is a small rocky island lying  southeast of the Terra Firma Islands in the southwest part of Mikkelsen Bay, off the west coast of Graham Land, Antarctica. It was first surveyed in 1948 by the Falkland Islands Dependencies Survey, who applied this name because of the presence of an ice arch formed by the icecap on this island.

References

Islands of Graham Land
Fallières Coast